According to UNESCO (2013), there are different braille alphabets for Urdu in India and in Pakistan.  The Indian alphabet is based on national Bharati Braille, while the Pakistani alphabet is based on Persian Braille.

Differences from Persian and Bharati Braille
Besides the addition of Urdu-specific consonants analogous to the additional letters in the print Urdu alphabet compared to the Persian alphabet, Pakistani Urdu Braille differs from Persian Braille in the transcription of the print letter  ž, which is written as a digraph in Urdu braille rather than as Persian , which in Urdu is used for  ḍ.  

Another such letter,  for  x, is shared with Gurmukhi Braille ਖ਼ x but with no other Bharati alphabet, where  is otherwise the vowel o.

Alphabets
Note:  It is not clear if these are written right-to-left or left-to-right.  The directionality of some of the digraphs may have gotten confused.

It is not clear if vowels in Indian Urdu Braille follow pronunciation and their Devanagari Braille equivalents, or print orthography.

Contractions
Pakistani Urdu Braille has several contractions beyond the aspirated consonants:  

Punctuation
Basic punctuation in Pakistan is the same as in India.  See Bharati Braille#Punctuation.

See also
Hindi Braille
Punjabi Braille

References

French-ordered braille alphabets
Bharati braille alphabets
Urdu
Arabic braille